Kim Hawtrey is an Australian economist, who has written on economics and on Christianity.

Biography 

He earned his doctorate at the University of New South Wales and studied at Moore Theological College. He has been Economist with the Reserve Bank of Australia, Chief Economist at Colonial State Bank, and a professor at Macquarie University in Sydney and Hope College in the United States.

He is a Fellow of Macquarie University and a Senior Fellow of the FINSIA Financial Services Institute of Australia.

Publications 
K. Hawtrey, 2009, Affordable Housing Finance, Studies in Banking and Finance Institutions Series, London: Palgrave Macmillan
J. Juttner and K. Hawtrey, 1997, Financial Markets, Money and Risk, Addison -Wesley Longman: Melbourne

References

Year of birth missing (living people)
Living people
Australian economists